The May Bumps 2001 were a set of rowing races held at Cambridge University from Wednesday 13 June 2001 to Saturday 16 June 2001. The event was run as a bumps race and was the 110th set of races in the series of May Bumps that have been held annually in mid-June since 1887. In 2001, a total of 172 crews took part (103 men's crews and 69 women's crews), with around 1500 participants in total.

The  Men's 1st VIII recorded the most places advanced during one series of bumps (either Mays, Lents, or Torpids/Eights for Oxford), advancing 13 places in the May Bumps 2001, where the crew moved up a division to division 3 and also won blades - a feat visible in the Bumps Charts below.

Head of the River crews 
 Emmanuel men bumped Jesus and Caius to take their first ever headship of the May Bumps.

 Caius women rowed-over in 1st position retaining the headship.

Highest 2nd VIIIs 
 The highest men's 2nd VIII for the 2nd consecutive year was Downing II.

 The highest women's 2nd VIII was Jesus II, who bumped Newnham II on day 3.

Links to races in other years

Bumps Charts 
Below are the bumps charts for the first 3 men's and women's divisions. The men's bumps charts are on the left, and women's bumps charts on the right. The bumps chart represents the progress of every crew over all four days of the racing. To follow the progress of any particular crew, simply find the crew's name on the left side of the chart and follow the line to the end-of-the-week finishing position on the right of the chart.

References 

May Bumps results
May Bumps
May Bumps
May Bumps